Blood Bowl 3 is a turn-based fantasy sports video game developed by Cyanide Studios and published by Nacon. It is a sequel to the 2015 video game Blood Bowl 2, based on the Blood Bowl board game by Games Workshop and is the third Blood Bowl game created by Cyanide. The game was released on 23 February 2023 for PlayStation 4, PlayStation 5, Windows, Xbox One and Xbox Series X/S, with a Nintendo Switch port to follow sometime later in 2023.

The game uses the newly updated Second Edition ruleset. It contains a single-player campaign as well as multiplayer.

The game was announced in August 2020 but had numerous delays and postponement to its release date. The launch was met with criticism over the new monetisation system introduced into the game, bugs and crashes, readability, as well as server issues and a lack of tools present in the previous game.

Gameplay
The game is a fantasy version of American football, played between two teams of up to 16 players, each team fielding up to 11 players at a time. Touchdowns are scored by taking the ball into the opposition's end zone.  Players  may attempt to injure, maim or kill the opposition in order to make scoring easier by reducing the number of enemy players on the field.

The game contains a new feature for the Blood Bowl series in that it introduces a battle pass system called "Blood Pass" which take place over three month long seasons and allow players to unlock cosmetics (such as dice, armour and balls). On completion of the pass a new faction is unlocked to play with. Players can also pay for the Blood Pass at the start of a season to instantly unlock the reward faction and also additional rewards as players progress through the tiers but these cosmetic items do not have any bearing on the actual gameplay. An in-game currency called Warpstone, which is earned by playing games or can be bought as a microtransaction, can be used to buy cosmetics such as helmets or shoulder pads.

The game is turn based and features strict 2 minute timed turns as well as a time bank of seven and a half minutes which players can use if they need extra time on a particular turn.

The single player campaign is called the Clash of Sponsors and sees players choose a team from one of the 12 factions to play for a sponsor with different perks and bonuses and beat bosses in the form of another team with a super star player.

Development
Cyanide had created the previous two Blood Bowl video games: Blood Bowl (released 2009) and Blood Bowl 2 (released 2015). They had gained the license to create the games following an out of court settlement with Games Workshop over similarities between Blood Bowl and Cyanide's 2004 game Chaos League.

In 2016, Games Workshop began supporting and releasing miniatures for the Blood Bowl board game after a 22 year hiatus. On 27 November 2020, they released a new ruleset called Blood Bowl Second Season Edition which saw new rosters and rules introduced to the game. This meant that Blood Bowl 2  was outdated and using old rules and as such Blood Bowl 3 would have to allow players to play the newly updated and current version of the game. Along with that Blood Bowl 2 was difficult to update with the new rules and so it was necessary to build a new game from scratch while moving to Unreal Engine for better graphics. Blood Bowl 3 had already entered development in 2018 on the old rules and so needed to be changed to comply with the new ones. Saul Jephcott and David Gasman reprise their roles from the previous game as the match commentators Jim and Bob.

Blood Bowl 3 was announced in August 2020 during Gamescom 2020 with a release in 'early 2021'. This proved too optimistic and in February 2021 the game was pushed to a release in August. In June the August release date was further pushed back to February 2022. The delay announcement was accompanied with a trailer showcasing the games campaign. A closed beta was run between the 3 and 13 June 2021 which required registering for. There was to be an early access release for PC in September 2021 but Cyanide announced an "indefinite delay". In November 2021, Nacon announced that the February 2022 release date was being further postponed due to delays caused by the COVID-19 pandemic and that the game would be released "later in 2022". Project manager Gautier Brésard addressed the delays by explaining that alongside the pandemic, Cyanide had been overly optimistic on the time scale needed to build the game from the ground up saying “We thought that we would be quicker since we’ve done it twice already. But actually it's still quite a lot of work, and having done it before doesn't make it go that much faster.”

In January 2022, Nacon announced that the game would no longer have an early access release as originally planned and would instead run another closed beta from 25 January to 2 February with a final full release on PC and consoles later in the year. Only players who had registered for the June 2021 closed beta had access. Another beta was held for PC between the 1 and 12 June 2022. Brésard stated that the beta tests had provided good player feedback which had inadvertently extended the development time of the game as Cyanide implemented the feedback on areas such as the user interface which players found too cluttered and the games colours which had to be toned down after some players complained of headaches.

In November 2022, Nacon announced that the game would release on 23 February 2023 on all platforms except Nintendo Switch which would come out later in 2023. The delay for the Switch release was due to the Switch's smaller screen which meant that the UI had to be tailored specifically to the platform.

A new gameplay trailer was shown at The Game Awards 2022. An overview trailer was released in early February to highlight differences with previous games and new features.

2 minute turns, compared to 4 minute turns in Blood Bowl 2, and the 7 and a half minute time bank  were introduced in an attempt to speed the game up and to cut down the length of games which could be over 1.5 to 2 hours in Blood Bowl 2 and was seen as a turn off for many new players. Brésard said "[our] goal was to reduce the time per match to around one hour."

A worry during development was the notion of 'runaway leaders' in the multiplayer setting which refers to the idea that teams that are highly developed and skilled can monopolise the multiplayer format. It was a problem in Blood Bowl 2 which was addressed by periodically wiping all teams and forcing players to start from new. Due to the introduction of three month long seasons and the new the way players level up and gain new skills in this edition of the game it allows coaches even more freedom and time to develop highly skilled teams. Brésard said that the problem of runaway leaders "may be more prevalent in Blood Bowl III". The board game addresses this problem by forcing teams to 'redraft' after each season and making players that are kept on between seasons more expensive and it was initially decided that this would be the system used in Blood Bowl 3 but that after the first season it would be reviewed to make sure "it's suited to the Blood Bowl III digital environment" or if another solution is necessary.

Cyanide worked closely with Games Workshop in the design process with a licensing manager attached to the project to ensure the design and creative work was  compliant with Games Workshop. Everything had to be approved by Games Worksop and Cyanide made effort to follow the existing board game miniatures and style wherever possible as well as taking inspiration from the official artwork. In areas where there was no artwork or miniature to copy they had to create original content, such as with the cheerleaders, to then be approved by Games Workshop.

Brésard said that the game may also receive more content that is featured in the Games Workshop magazines White Dwarf and Spike! Magazine such as special play cards and race specific wizards, features that aren't in the game at launch.

A change from Blood Bowl 2 is the tutorial and how new players are taught the game because "Blood Bowl is a very complex game, very hard to get into." It was felt the tutorial in Blood Bowl 2 was overly long and so an aim with this game was to compress the tutorial down to 45 to 60 minutes and teach the 'basic tools' to play the game. Another change with the previous game is that Blood Bowl 3 contains a formation editor which players can use outside of games to create formations which can be quickly accessed in games. The campaign focus was to make it less linier than the previous game and increase replayability and the ability to play as any faction as opposed to only humans.

Release
The game was released on 23 February 2023 for PlayStation 4, PlayStation 5, Windows, Xbox One and Xbox Series X/S with the Nintendo Switch version to be released later in 2023. The game featured 12 races to play on release with more to be added. The races at release were; Black Orcs, Chaos Chosen, Chaos Renegades, Dark Elf, Dwarfs, Elven Union, Humans, Imperial Nobility, Nurgle, Old World Alliance, Orcs and Skaven. The game had 4 pre-order editions, the basic being the 'Standard Edition' which came with 3 extra team logos and a dice set as a bonus. Two race specific editions, one for Black Orcs and the other for Imperial Nobility, were available with bonus extra cosmetic gear for the players of each specific race and also an extra ball and dice. The 'Brutal Edition' contained all of the above but also included a 48 hour early access from the 21 February, extra cheerleader cosmetics and 1000 warpstone (the in-game currency). Many customers had problems with cosmetics not rendering correctly or disappearing and some players who bought the standard edition of the game were given customisation options from higher tier editions which Cyanide announced would be addressed. Cyanide acknowledged that all editions gained the 1000 warpstone and cosmetic bonuses that should have only applied to Brutal Edition. It was decided that while the warpstone would not be taken off gamers, the bonus cosmetics would. In addition, Brutal Edition buyers would gain an additional 1000, and those who played during the early access launch a further 250 warpstone.

Administrators of numerous private multiplayer leagues on Blood Bowl 2, including the Reddit run REBBL, signed an open letter to Cyanide and to Nacon, highlighting that many features used to create and run private leagues present in Blood Bowl 2 were not present in Blood Bowl 3 and were not in the roadmap of post launch development. The letter stated that without these tools it would “severely hamper the potential we all see in BB3” and diminish the player base and that these player run leagues would not move on to the new game until the issues were addressed. Cyanide responded to the letter saying that the tools would be available in a couple of weeks.

Reception

Blood Bowl 3 received "mixed or average reviews" according to review aggregator Metacritic, based on 19 reviews for Windows. Robin Valentine writing for PC Gamer criticised the microtransactions within the game along with the numerous bugs that were present during the review period just before release. The UI was described as 'messy' and 'awkward' and he found the players hard to differentiate. He went on to predict the game would have a 'disastrous launch' due to it being 'fundamentally unfinished'. Timothy Linward at Wargamer praised the core game and also the graphics as an improvement on its predecessor but found it hard to follow what was happening in the game or differentiate the player models on some teams. He also had problems with bugs and the AI of the game in single-player. Wargamer also criticised the early access due to the bugs, crashes and server issues at release with Cyanide coming out in a statement to say they were dealing with the problems and blamed the large volume of players overwhelming the servers. Wargamer also later conceded that the game they had reviewed was not representative of the one that was released. TheGamer praised the variety of cosmetic upgrades, the tournament management options and the core game but had doubts over the microtransaction and live-service direction of the game.

Jake Tucker in NME said that the game was "Bug-infested and content-light" and that it shouldn't have launched in such a poor condition. NME also collected fan reviews which criticised the microtransactions and the poor launch. Andrei Dumitrescu for Softpedia gave the game a positive review praising the customisation and tournament options but also pointing out the technical issues the game faced at launch. IGN couldn't find any reason to recommend the game over its predecessor describing it as "a sloppy, muddy, buggy rehash of a better game".

In the week of its release users on Steam had reviewed the game as 'mostly negative' due to the launch issues, monetisation and bugs/crashes. Cyanide apologised for the poor launch and responded to the criticism around its monetisation system by saying they would make it fair, rewarding and optional.

References

External links

2023 video games
Fantasy sports video games
PlayStation 5 games
Cyanide (company) games
Nacon games
Multiplayer and single-player video games
PlayStation 4 games
Sports management video games
Video game sequels
Video games developed in France
Blood Bowl video games
Warhammer Fantasy video games
Windows games
Xbox One games
Nintendo Switch games
Xbox Series X and Series S games
Orcs in popular culture